Xubida linearellus, the x-linear grass-veneer, is a moth in the family Crambidae. It was described by Zeller in 1863. It is found in North America, where it has been recorded from Florida, Oklahoma and South Carolina.

References

Haimbachiini
Moths described in 1863